This is a list of women writers who were born in Austria or  whose writings are closely associated with that country.

A
Emma Adler (1858–1935), journalist, historical novelist, non-fiction writer, newspaper publisher, translator
Ilse Aichinger (1921–2016), essayist, non-fiction writer, novelist, acclaimed for her works on Nazi atrocities
Renate Aichinger (born 1976), playwright, theatre director
Rachel Akerman (1522–1544), early Jewish poet, author of Geheimniss des Hofes 
Ruth Aspöck (born 1947), novelist, short story writer, poet
Susanne Ayoub (born 1956), Austrian-Iraqi novelist, journalist filmmaker

B
Ingeborg Bachmann (1926–1973), poet, playwright for radio, essayist, short story writer
Bettina Balàka (born 1966), novelist, poet, playwright, short story writer
Vicki Baum (1888–1960), novelist, famous for Menschen im Hotel filmed as Grand Hotel 
Elsa Bernstein (1866–1949), playwright, wrote an account of her imprisonment at Theresienstadt concentration camp
Kirstin Breitenfellner (born 1966), novelist, journalist, critic, yoga teacher 
Christine Busta (1915–1987), poet, children's writer

C
Ada Christen (1839–1901), poet, short story writer, and writer of sketches
Monika Czernin (born 1965), writer, screenwriter and film director

D
Beatrice von Dovsky (1866–1923), poet, actress, remembered above all for her libretto for Max von Schillings' Mona Lisa
Helene von Druskowitz (1856–1918), playwright, critic, poet

E
Marie von Ebner-Eschenbach (1830–1916), psychological novelist, playwright, short story writer, important literary figure of the late 19th century
Bertha Eckstein-Diener (1874–1948), journalist, feminist historian, travel writer, used the pen name Sir Galahad

F
Lilian Faschinger (born 1950), novelist, short story writer, poet, translator
Vera Ferra-Mikura (1923–1997), children's writer
Alexandra Föderl-Schmid (born 1971), journalist, newspaper editor
Barbara Frischmuth (born 1941), novelist, poet, playwright, children's writer, translator
Marianne Fritz (1948–2007), novelist
Camilla Frydan (1887–1949), soprano, composer and lyricist

G
Elfriede Gerstl (1932–2009), poet, novelist, essayist, short story writer, feminist contributions
Anna Gmeyner (1902–1991), British-Austrian novelist, playwright, scriptwriter, wrote in both German and English
Marie Eugenie Delle Grazie (1864–1931), poet, playwright, novelist
Alice Gurschner (1869–1944), novelist, playwright, poet

H
Maja Haderlap (born 1961), bilingual Slovenian-German Austrian writer.
Enrica von Handel-Mazzetti (1871–1955), poet, historical novelist
Marlen Haushofer (1920–1970), novelist, short story writer, author of Die Wand, translated as The Wall (novel)
Stella K. Hershan (1915–2014), Austrian-American novelist and biographer

I
Eva Ibbotson (1925–2010), Austrian-born English-language writer, novelist, best known as a children's writer
Lotte Ingrisch (1930–2022), prolific novelist, playwright, television screenwriter

J
Maria Janitschek (1859–1927), pen name Marius Stein, poet, short story writer
Christine Maria Jasch (born 1960), economist, non-fiction writer
Elfriede Jelinek (born 1946), playwright, novelist, poet, translator, Nobel Prize in 2004, several novels published in English

K
Gina Kaus (1893–1985), Austrian-American novelist, screenwriter, autobiographer
Marie-Thérèse Kerschbaumer (born 1936), successful novelist, poet 
Margarete Kollisch (1893–1979), poet, journalist, translator
Susanna Kubelka (born 1942), journalist, widely translated novelist

L
Minna Lachs (1907–1993), educator and memoirist
Christine Lavant (1915–1973), mystically religious poet, novelist
Käthe Leichter (1895–1942), politician, economist, journalist
Gerda Lerner (1920–2013), Austrian-born English-language playwright, non-fiction author, feminist 
Cvetka Lipuš (born 1966), Slovene-language poet, translated into English
Mira Lobe (1913–1995), prolific children's writer, some works published in English

M
Dorothea Macheiner (born 1943), novelist, essayist, poet, playwright
Ruth Mader (born 1974), screenwriter, wrote and directed Struggle
Ruth Maier (1920–1942), diarist, described her experiences of the Nazis from 1933 until she was sent to Auschwitz
Rosa Mayreder (1858–1938), feminist writer, women's rights campaigner
Friederike Mayröcker (1924–2021), important contemporary poet, playwright
Eva Menasse (born 1970), journalist, novelist
Helene Migerka, (1867–1928), poet, prose writer
Olga Misař (1876–1950), peace activist, feminist, writer
Hermynia zur Mühlen (1883–1951), novelist, translator
Doris Mühringer (1920–2009), poet, short story writer, children's writer 
Anitta Müller-Cohen (1890–1962), journalist, social worker, politician 
Melissa Müller (born 1967), journalist, novelist, author of Anne Frank: The Biography (1920–1942)

N
Marie von Najmajer (1844–1904), historical novelist, poet, playwright, women's activist
Christine Nöstlinger (1936–2018), highly acclaimed children's writer, several works published in English

O
Blanche Christine Olschak (1913–1989), journalist, encyclopaedia writer
Doris Orgel (1929–2021), Austrian-born English-language children's writer, non-fiction writer on Asian topics

P
Bertha Pappenheim (1859–1936), short story writer, playwright, poet, children's writer
Hertha Pauli (1906–1973), journalist, children's writer, non-fiction writer, wrote in both German and English
Ida Laura Pfeiffer (1797–1858), early travel writer, translated into seven languages 
Karoline Pichler (1769–1843), novelist, libretto writer
Hella Pick (born 1929), Austrian-born British journalist, also non-fiction works
Adelheid Popp (1869–1939), feminist writer and journalist, autobiographer
Katharina Prato (1818–1897), cookbook writer
Paula von Preradović (1887–1951), poet, wrote the words to the Austrian national anthem: Land der Berge, Land am Strome
Theresa Pulszky (1819–1866), Hungarian history and travel writer

R
Elisabeth Reichart (born 1953), novelist, playwright, short story writer
Kathrin Röggla (born 1971), playwright, essayist, poet

S
Sophie von Scherer (1817–1876), epistolary novelist
Helene Scheu-Riesz (1880–1970), children's writer, publisher and women's rights activist
Adele Schreiber-Krieger (1872–1957), feminist writer, politician
Carolina Schutti (born 1976), novelist, biographer, non-fiction writer, literary scholar, educator
Brigitte Schwaiger (1949–2010), best-selling novelist
Barbara Schurz (born 1973), poststructuralist writer, playwright, co-authoring with Alexander Brener
Lore Segal (born 1928), Austrian-born American novelist, short story writer, children's writer
Gitta Sereny (1921–2012), journalist, biographer, non-fiction works, wrote in both German and English
Hilde Spiel (1911–1990), journalist, essayist, critic
Bertha von Suttner (1843–1914), novelist, short story writer, essayist, pacifist, Nobel Peace Prize, some works published in English

T
Franziska Tausig (c. 1895–1989), Jewish emigrant to Shanghai, memoirs published as Shanghai Passage: Flucht und Exil einer Wienerin (Escape and Exile of a Viennese Woman)
Maria von Trapp (1905–1987), Austrian-American writer, famous for her The Story of the Trapp Family Singers 
Maria Treben (1907–1991), herbalist, famous for her Gesundheit aus der Apotheke Gottes - Ratschläge und Erfahrungen mit Heilkräutern (Health Through God's Pharmacy) translated into 24 languages

V
Hannelore Valencak (1929–2004), novelist, poet, children's writer

Z
Birgit Zotz (born 1979), non-fiction writer, essayist, writings on Buddhist culture, mysticism, tourism 
Berta Zuckerkandl (1864–1945), journalist, critic, non-fiction writer

See also
List of Austrian writers
List of women writers

References

External links
VO Österreichische Autorinnen

-
Austrian women writers, List of
Writers
Writers,